Careful What You Wish For is Jonatha Brooke's fifth studio album, released in 2007.

Track listing

 "Careful What You Wish For" – 3:59
 "Beautiful Girl" – 4:04
 "Keep the River on your Right" – 3:49
 "I'll Leave the Light On" – 3:51
 "Baby Wait" – 3:43
 "Hearsay" – 3:00
 "Forgiven" – 5:11
 "Je N'Peux Pas Te Plaire" – 3:40
 "Prodigal Daughter" – 4:07
 "After the Tears" – 4:27
 "Never Too Late for Love" – 2:40

References

2007 albums
Jonatha Brooke albums
Bad Dog Records albums